St. Joseph's College is a government-aided Catholic school in Gaborone, Botswana.

The school was founded in 1928 by the Catholic Church to form and inform Batswana children. A government-aided mission school, it is financed by the government of Botswana and owned and managed by the Roman Catholic Diocese of Gaborone.

The college follows the national curriculum as outlined by the Botswana Ministry of Education and Skills Development and at the end of their academic programme, students sit for the Botswana General Certificate of Secondary Education (BGCSE) terminal examination.

The school has been the leading government senior school in the country, academically, for several years and is a school well known for the disciplined behaviour of its students. It was successful in the 2015 national examinations, as 51.29 percent of its students attained five credits or better, making it the only government senior school to exceed a percentage of 40 in that year.

Motto

The school's motto is Per Aspera Ad Astra. Ad astra is a Latin phrase meaning "to the stars" and per aspera is also a Latin phrase meaning "through difficulties" or "through hardships".

St Joseph's Mission Clinic
St. Joseph's College has its own personal clinic for students where they can be attended to by qualified clinic personnel. The clinic also gives help to members of the public who are aware of its existence without denial. Most workers in the clinic are nuns trained as nurses and qualified medical practitioners.

School identity

Colour(s)
Royal blue, Sky blue & Grey

Houses

Boys' uniform

 Royal-blue jersey with school logo
 Kgale-blue shirt with logo
 St Joseph's College blazer
 Tie with school logo
 Grey trousers
 Grey or black socks
 Black leather flat-heeled school shoes

Girls' uniform

 Kgale-blue dress with school logos
 Kgale-blue socks
 Royal-blue jersey with school logo
 St Joseph's College blazer
 Tie with school logo
 Black leather flat-heeled school shoes

Co-curricular activities

  Athletics
  Badminton
  Basketball
  Chess

  Cricket
  Football
  Karate
  Rugby

  Swimming
  Table Tennis
  Tennis
  Volleyball

Performance

See also

 Education in Botswana
 List of secondary schools in Botswana
 Saint Joseph

References

1928 establishments in the British Empire
20th-century establishments in Botswana
Educational institutions established in 1928
Mixed-sex education
Roman Catholic Diocese of Gaborone
Catholic secondary schools in Africa
Catholic schools in Botswana
Secondary schools in Gaborone